Kim Jong-Seong (born 12 March 1988) is a South Korean footballer who plays as midfielder for FC Anyang in K League Challenge.

Career
He joined Yongin City in 2011 after graduating from college.

References

External links 

1988 births
Living people
Association football midfielders
South Korean footballers
Suwon FC players
FC Anyang players
Korea National League players
K League 2 players
Ajou University alumni